The Florida State Seminoles football team has represented Florida State University in collegiate football since 1947. As Florida State College from 1902-1904. The following is a list of Florida State Seminoles football seasons.

Florida State College
Florida State College, forerunner of Florida State University, played three years of intercollegiate football from 1902 to 1904. In 1905 the state legislature passed the Buckman Act and Florida State College became Florida State College for Women. The University of Florida at Lake City moved to Gainesville and merged with the East Florida Seminary to form a new University of Florida. FSU did not play football again until 1947.

Seasons

Notes

References

Florida State
Florida State Seminoles football seasons
Florida State Seminoles football